Edward Schoeneck (August 1, 1875 in Syracuse, Onondaga County, New York – June 22, 1951 in Syracuse, Onondaga County, New York) was an American lawyer and politician. He was Lieutenant Governor of New York from 1915 to 1918.

Life
He studied law at Syracuse University and was admitted to the bar in 1903. In 1902, he was elected to the Board of Supervisors of Onondaga County. He was a member of the New York State Assembly (Onondaga Co., 2nd D.) in 1904, 1905, 1906 and 1907. He was Mayor of Syracuse from 1910 to 1913.

In 1910, he ran for Lieutenant Governor on the ticket with Henry Lewis Stimson, but was defeated. He was Lieutenant Governor of New York from 1915 to 1918, elected on the Republican ticket in 1914 and 1916 with Governor Charles S. Whitman, but both were defeated for re-election in 1918.

He was a delegate to the New York State Convention to ratify the 21st Amendment in 1933.

Sources

1875 births
1951 deaths
American people of German descent
Mayors of Syracuse, New York
Lieutenant Governors of New York (state)
Republican Party members of the New York State Assembly
Syracuse University alumni